The 1971–72 Yugoslav First League season was the 26th season of the First Federal League of Yugoslavia, the top level association football competition of SFR Yugoslavia, since its establishment in 1946. A total of 18 teams competed in the league, with the previous season's runners-up Željezničar Sarajevo winning the title.

League table

Results

Winning squad

Top scorers

See also
1971–72 Yugoslav Second League
1971–72 Yugoslav Cup

External links
Yugoslavia Domestic Football Full Tables

Yugoslav First League seasons
Yugo
1971–72 in Yugoslav football